Kung Fu Ramone is the second album by Japanese rock band Guitar Wolf. It was released only on vinyl in the U.S., in 1994. Some of the songs on the LP were later re-recorded and used on their debut compact disc album, Run Wolf Run, as well as in later projects.

Track listing
 "Kung Fu Ramone"
 "Thunders Guitar"
 "Genocide"
 "Run Wolf Run"
 "Jett Rock"
 "El Toro"
 "Ryusei Noise"
 "Baby Indian"
 "The Wild Guitar"
 "Buttobase!! Allnight"
 "Kick Out the Jams"
 "Rumble"
 "Planet Blues"

References

1994 albums
Guitar Wolf albums